St James the Great is James, son of Zebedee, one of the twelve apostles of Jesus.

St James the Great may also refer to:

Churches

UK
 Church of St James the Great, Ewhurst Green, a church in East Sussex, England
 Church of St James the Great, Fitzhead, a church in Somerset, England
 Church of St James the Great, Fulbrook, a church in Oxfordshire, England
 Church of St James the Great, Haydock, a church in the diocese of Liverpool, England
 Church of St James the Great, Sedgley, a church in the West Midlands, England
 St James the Great Church, Dauntsey, a church in Wiltshire, England
 St James the Great Church, Wrightington, a church in Lancashire, England
 St James the Great, a church in Elmsted, Kent, England
 St James the Great, a church in Salt, Staffordshire, England
 St James the Great, Cardiff, a defunct church in Wales
 St James the Great, Friern Barnet, a church in north London
 St James the Great, Morpeth, a church in Morpeth, Northumberland, England
 St James the Great, Shirley, a church in Birmingham, England

Other countries
 Church of St James the Great, Worcester a church in South Africa
 Saint James the Great Parish Church (Bolinao), a church in the Philippines
 St James the Great Church, a church in Flushing, Netherlands
 St James the Great, St Kilda East, a church in Glen Eira, Victoria, Australia

Other uses
 Saint James the Great (El Greco), a 1610 painting by El Greco

See also 
 Saint James (disambiguation)